The Lunchbox is a 2013 Hindi-language drama film written and directed by Ritesh Batra. Produced by Guneet Monga, Anurag Kashyap and Arun Rangachari, The Lunchbox is an international co-production of studios in India, the US, Germany and France. It stars Irrfan Khan and Nimrat Kaur alongside Nawazuddin Siddiqui, Bharti Achrekar and Nakul Vaid in supporting roles.

The Lunchbox was screened at International Critics' Week at the 2013 Cannes Film Festival, and later won the Critics Week Viewers Choice Award also known as Grand Rail d'Or. It was shown at the 2013 Toronto International Film Festival. The film was released in theatres in India on 20 September 2013. The Lunchbox was a box-office success and received unanimous critical acclaim. It was Khan's highest-grossing Hindi film, until it was surpassed by Hindi Medium (2017). The Lunchbox was nominated for Best Film Not in the English Language at the 2015 British Academy Film Awards .

Plot 

In Mumbai, Ila is a young wife seeking her husband Rajeev's attention. She tries to put romance back into her marriage by cooking delicious lunches for him. However, when she tries to send the lunchbox to his office, the dabbawala system which is to deliver his lunch has a mix-up, and the lunchbox accidentally reaches Saajan Fernandes instead. Saajan is a widower who is about to retire from his accountancy job. When Ila realises the mistake she writes a letter to Saajan informing him of the mix-up and places it in the lunchbox the next day. An exchange of messages between Ila and Saajan via the lunches thus ensues, igniting a friendship between the two, as they share memories and events from their lives.

At his job, Saajan is tasked with training his replacement Aslam Sheikh. Socially distant after his wife's death, Saajan is initially reluctant to interact with Sheikh and train him. After Sheikh reveals that he is an orphan who taught himself accounting, Saajan gradually warms to him; eventually the duo strike a close friendship. At one point, Saajan saves Shaikh's job by covering for his blatant mistakes and becomes his best man at his marriage. Meanwhile, after Ila finds out that Rajeev is having an affair, she gives up hope on rekindling her marriage. In one of the lunchbox letters, she suggests moving to Bhutan where the cost of living is much cheaper than in India. Saajan writes back suggesting that the two move there together. Ila then offers to meet in person at a popular restaurant but at the appointed time, Saajan does not show up. Upon receiving an empty lunchbox on the next day, Saajan writes back to the dejected Ila and apologises to her, saying that he did arrive and saw her from a distance but could not approach her. He explains how young and beautiful she looked, while surmising that he is too old for her and advising her to move on.

Some time later, Ila's father, battling with lung cancer, dies in the care of her mother who confesses how unhappy her marriage was. Ila gets the address of Saajan's office only to learn from Sheikh that he has already retired and headed to Nashik. She writes a last farewell message to Saajan announcing that she has decided to leave Rajeev and move to Bhutan with her young daughter.  Meanwhile, Saajan changes his mind and returns to Mumbai. The film ends with Ila waiting for her daughter to return from school and Saajan heading to her house with the dabbawala who regularly picked up and delivered the eponymous lunchbox.

Cast
 Irrfan Khan as Saajan Fernandes
 Nimrat Kaur as Ila Singh
 Nawazuddin Siddiqui as Aslam Shaikh, Saajan's colleague
 Lillete Dubey as Ila's mother
 Nakul Vaid as Rajiv Singh, Ila's husband
 Bharati Achrekar as Mrs. Deshpande a.k.a. "Auntie", Ila's neighbour (voice only)
 Yashvi Puneet Nagar as Yashvi Singh, Ila & Rajiv's daughter
 Denzil Smith as Mr. Shroff, Saajan's office boss
 Shruti Bapna as Mehrunissa, Shaikh's wife

Production

Development 
Ritesh Batra, who had made short films, The Morning Ritual, Gareeb Nawaz Ki Taxi and Cafe Regular, Cairo, started researching for a documentary on the famous Lunchbox delivery system of Mumbai, dabbawala, known for their efficiency, however after spending a week with them in 2007, he got to know of many interesting personal stories they would overhear while waiting outside an apartment. This idea gave birth to the idea of the film, and instead of making the documentary he began writing a film script. In time the film became a joint production between Sikhya Entertainment, DAR motion pictures, National Film Development Corporation of India (NFDC), India, ROH Films, Germany, ASAP Films, France and the Cine Mosaic, US of Lydia Dean Pilcher who previously produced films like, The Talented Mr Ripley (1999) and The Namesake (2007), and Germany's Match Factory became its international sales agent.

Writing 
Batra completed the first draft of the screenplay in 2011. He was assisted by Rutvik Oza. It went on to win an Honorable Jury Mention at the 2012 Cinemart at the Rotterdam International Film Festival. Thereafter the project was part of the Talent Project Market of Berlin International Film Festival and was mentored at the screenwriter's lab (Torino Film Lab) at the Torino Film Festival. The character of Ila played by Nimrat Kaur, six months prior to the shooting, and the character played by Nawazuddin Siddiqui was further developed and improvised during shooting.

Casting 
Irrfan Khan liked the script of the film and the concept of his character, not speaking much but talking through notes. After seeing Batra's short film and a couple of meetings he agreed to act in the film. Batra wanted to work with Nawazuddin Siddiqui, another principal character of the film, for a long time. For the female lead, auditions were conducted, wherein Nimrat Kaur was selected. Kaur had extensive experience at the Mumbai theatre and worked in films like Peddlers. Some of the dabbawalas whom the director befriended while researching for the film, also were cast in minor roles.

Filming 
The film was shot in 2012 in Mumbai at a budget of ₹220 million. Prior to the filming, the cast rehearsed for six months. It was shot using the Arri Alexa digital film camera. Many of the scenes were logistically broken down to make way for last minute location changes. According to Ritesh Batra, scenes on the train involved the use of only one compartment, and even included actual local commuters when needed.

Principal photography lasted 29 days, with a majority of the film's scenes done in three weeks. Afterwards, footage taken in a documentary manner were shot. Mumbai's famous dabbawalas were provided actual lunchboxes to deliver, and followed by a four-member film crew, which filmed the process in documentary style.

Release and reception

Screenings and film festivals
The film was screened on 19 May 2013 as a part of the International Critics' Week at the 2013 Cannes Film Festival, where it received a standing ovation and positive reviews. It won the Critics Week Viewers Choice Award also known as Grand Rail d'Or. Variety called it "a notable debut from tyro helmer-scripter Ritesh Batra", for creating a film with "crossover appeal of Monsoon Wedding", and also praised acting of Irrfan Khan and Nimrat Kaur.

Thereafter, Sony Pictures Classics picked up all North American rights for distribution.

In India, this film was released in more than 400 screens on 20 September 2013. In Japan, a Japanese dubbed version of the film was released on 9 August 2014, screening in a hundred theaters.

Box office
The Lunchbox grossed ₹71 million in its first weekend of release in India, and ₹110 million in its first week. The film continued to gross significant amounts over the next few weeks, earning over ₹200 million in the first three weeks and another estimated ₹40–50 lakhs on its fourth weekend.

In the United States, The Lunchbox grossed $4.23 million, and was 2014's third highest grossing foreign film behind Cantinflas and P.K.. It was Irrfan Khan's highest-grossing Hindi film, up until it was surpassed by Hindi Medium (2017).

The Japanese dubbed version, released later in 2014, screened in a hundred theaters for ten weeks. Combined, the Hindi and Japanese versions grossed an estimated  overseas and  worldwide.

Critical reception
The Lunchbox received widespread critical acclaim from both critics and audiences alike. On the review aggregator website Rotten Tomatoes, 97% of 118 critics' reviews are positive, with an average rating of 8.08/10. The website's consensus reads, "Warm, affectionate, and sweet but not cloying, The Lunchbox is a clever crowd-pleaser from first-time director Ritesh Batra."

Critic Rajeev Masand of CNN-IBN gave a rating of 5/5 to the film stating, "The greatest love stories are the ones that make you root for the protagonists to come together, despite their destinies. This film illustrates how love transforms the unlikeliest of people." Pratim D. Gupta of The Telegraph gave two thumbs up to The Lunchbox calling it "as much a moving and muted love story as it is an evocative portrayal of loneliness." Taran Adarsh of Bollywood Hungama gave the movie a 4/5 stating, "A well-told old-fashioned romance, The Lunchbox gracefully unknots the trials, tribulations, fears and hopes of everyday people sans the glamour that the city of Mumbai has become synonymous with." Karan Anshuman of Mumbai Mirror also went with a perfect score of 5/5 saying the film was, "one of the best films to come out of India in a long time."

Raja Sen of Rediff.com praised the film further, giving another perfect score of 5/5 and offered particular compliments to the director Ritesh Batra, stating "Batra, who has also written The Lunchbox, has allowed his smashing actors tremendous room to improvise, all the while himself sketching in nuanced details about the city, its food-ferriers, and the many disparities Mumbai is crammed with." Filmmaker/critic Khalid Mohammed of the Deccan Chronicle said "What stays in the mind at the end of The Lunchbox is pretty much what stays in mind at the end of a memorable set by jazzmen – not their lapses but the heights they scale." Aditya Grover of YouthTimes gave it 4/5 stars and said, "The Lunchbox is delicious and delightful! If you're in the mood to witness genuinely moving cinema, you're in for a treat. The delectable taste of this lunchbox remains in your mouth much after you've left the theatre. Go for it!" Suparna Sharma of The Asian Age gave it 4 out of 5 stars and said: "The Lunchbox is a gently pulsating sweet-sad story of loneliness and love, of wilting spirits finding water again. There are three women in three marriages in this film, of which two are ailing. The third one is over, almost, only the last rites haven't been performed. There are two men in the film – one who has lived a full life and is getting ready to quietly slip off the face of the earth; the other is eager to begin… What's both shocking and soothing is what the film shows us — that it takes very little for a soul to come back to life. Mostly, just a hint of hope will do."

Trisha Gupta in the Sunday Guardian wrote "The Lunchbox is a lovely little film. But it does tick all the boxes that might appeal to festival audiences: quaint Asian urbanism (Mumbai trains, dabba delivery), Indian home-cooking, romance. It provides local colour, without being demandingly untranslatable." In a less positive review for the Chicago Reader, J. R. Jones criticized the film's premise as a gimmick and its purported use of "irritating comic foil" in reference to Nawazuddin Siddiqui's and Bharati Achrekar's characters as Shaikh and Mrs. Deshpande, respectively.

Oscar selection controversy
The Lunchbox was considered by many people throughout the year to be a lock as India's selection for the 86th Academy Awards Best Foreign Film Category, with many critics enthusiastically praising it and voting for it to be the representative film. Director Karan Johar also put his support behind the film saying "All kinds of audience can connect with it and yet within the parameters of love story it is completely unusual. You feel all the love in the world for the protagonists and the unusual aspect of it is they haven't met."

However, the selection committee of the Film Federation of India (FFI) deliberated on 17 September 2013 and decided to send the Gujarati film The Good Road instead. This decision sparked outrage from many supporters of The Lunchbox, including its cast and crew. The film's producer Anurag Kashyap quickly took to Twitter and expressed his disgust, saying "I don't know who the Federation is, but it goes to show the complete lack of understanding to make films that can travel across borders." He later deleted both his Twitter and Facebook accounts, saying, "this is a moment of defeat for me, and for independent cinema, because, for once, our chances were great." Karan Johar also said he felt very disappointed that such a wonderful chance at Oscar glory with The Lunchbox was spoiled. Guneet Monga, The Lunchbox other producer, said she was flabbergasted as to how the Federation could select a movie that didn't even have an American distributor, and also listed the number of global festivals and appreciation her film received, concluding that it sadly and supposedly "wasn't enough for the FFI".

In an interview with Siddharth Sivakumar of Tinpahar, Goutam Ghose, the chairman of the committee revealed:

Once it had been submitted to the Oscar selection committee, that committee did not nominate, nor shortlist, The Good Road; that year's Academy Award winner was Italy's The Great Beauty.

Accolades

See also

Bollywood films of 2013

Notes

References

External links
 
 
 
 

2013 films
2010s Hindi-language films
2013 drama films
2013 independent films
Adultery in films
Films scored by Max Richter
Films directed by Ritesh Batra
Films set in Mumbai
Films shot in Mumbai
Indian drama films
Indian independent films
Sony Pictures Classics films
UTV Motion Pictures films
2013 directorial debut films
Hindi-language drama films